Timber Creek High School is a public high school located in the city of Fort Worth, Texas which is served by the Keller Independent School District. The campus opened its doors in the fall of 2009 and was Keller ISD's fourth high school. Its first graduating class was in the spring of 2012. In 2015, the school was rated "Met Standard" by the Texas Education Agency.

A majority of the students zoned for TCHS live in the city limits of Fort Worth in an area roughly bordered by Interstate 35 to the west, Highway 170 on the north, Highway 377 to the east, and Heritage Trace Parkway to the south. As of the 2015–2016 school year, the campus housed approximately 3275 students in grades 9-12.

The school coffeeshop, The Daily Grind, opened in 2017, the first of its kind in Keller ISD. Students selected the name of the establishment via a poll on Twitter. The coffeeshop makes a "Falconccino", which is similar to a frappucino with the name referring to the school mascot; a student created the name of the drink. Students also designed the appearance of the coffeeshop.

Athletics
The Timber Creek Falcons compete in these sports:

Baseball
Basketball
Cross country
Football
Golf
Soccer
Softball
Swimming and diving
Tennis
Track and field
Volleyball
Wrestling

References

External links
 Official website

Public high schools in Fort Worth, Texas
High schools in Tarrant County, Texas
Public high schools in Texas
2009 establishments in Texas
Educational institutions established in 2009